Llandovery Falls is a small waterfall located in Saint Ann Parish, Jamaica. The falls were named after a nearby sugar estate. The falls became well known after a photograph of them taken by James Johnston was used on the first one-penny stamp in Jamaica. In the early 20th century the falls were described on a tourist postcard as "A never-failing source of fresh water containing a fair amount of fish".

References

Waterfalls of Jamaica